The 2015–16 BFA Senior League was the 25th season of the Bahamas top-flight football league.

Standings

References

BFA Senior League seasons
Bahamas
BFA Senior League
BFA Senior League